Rafter is the performing name of the American musician and producer Rafter Roberts.  He also owns his own studio, Singing Serpent, in San Diego, California, United States.

In 2005 he formed the project Bunky together with Emily Joyce. The name is a combination of the words "bunny" and "monkey" while they released one album, Born To Be A Motorcycle (Asthmatic Kitty, 2005).

In January 2019 he started a megaseries of Rafter releases with the album Terrestrial Extras and set a release schedule of a new Rafter album every month for the duration of the year.

Discography

Albums
 Sweaty Magic (Asthmatic Kitty, 2008)
 Sex Death Cassette (Asthmatic Kitty)
 Music for Total Chickens (Asthmatic Kitty, 2007)
 10 Songs (Rafter) (Asthmatic Kitty, 2006)
 Born to be a Motorcycle as a member of Bunky
 Animal Feelings (Asthmatic Kitty, 2010)
 Quiet Storm (Asthmatic Kitty, 2011)
 It's Reggae (Asthmatic Kitty, 2014)
XYZ (Joyful Noise Recordings, 2016)
Terrestrial Extras (Rad Lazer, January 2019)
Rhythm Box (Rad Lazer, February 2019)
Omnivore (Rad Lazer, March 2019)

Producer
 Part I: John Shade, Your Fortune's Made by Fol Chen (2009)
 Various Soul-Junk and Castanets albums
 The Rapture Mirror debut EP
 The Fiery Furnaces- Rehearsing My Choir
 Shapes and Sizes
 GoGoGo Airheart
 The Album Leaf

Performer
 Bunky
 The Free*Stars
 Various Soul-Junk and Castanets albums

References

External links

Record producers from California
Asthmatic Kitty artists
Musical groups from San Diego
Indie rock musical groups from California
Joyful Noise Recordings artists